Long Bay College is a state co-educational secondary school located in Torbay, a suburb of the North Shore in Auckland, New Zealand. The decile 10 school serves Years 9 to 13, and has  students as of  Christopher (CJ) Healey is the school's current principal. Long Bay College has a large zone boundary including the upper east coast bays, Brookfield, Albany, Albany heights, Redvale, Coatesville, Paremoremo and Brighams creek.  Long Bay College in NCEA school exams 88.5% of students passed in Level 1 year 11 a 2.8% decrease compared to last year, 89.6% of students passed in Level 2 year 12 a 3.5% decrease compared to last year, 88.4% of students passed in Level 3 year 13 a 4.5% increase compared to last year, 76.1% of students entered universities a 0.7% decrease compared to last year.

History
Long Bay College first opened in 1975. The first principal of Long Bay College was Ian Sage, who then had a street directly leading from the school named after him - Ian Sage Avenue. Like most of New Zealand state secondary schools in the 1970s, the school was built to the S68 design, characterised by single-storey classroom blocks with masonry walls, low-pitched roofs with protruding clerestory windows, and internal open courtyards.

Enrolment
On the August 2018 Education Review Office (ERO) review of the school, Long Bay College had 1408 students, including 154 international students. The school roll's gender composition was 51% male and 49% female, and its ethnic composition was 52% New Zealand European (Pākehā), 28% Other European, 8% Asian, 6% Māori, 2% Pacific Islanders, and 5% Other.

Principals
Mr CJ Healey – Current principal since 2017
Mr Russell Brooke – 2008 to 2017
Mrs Stephanie Norrie – 2000 to 2008
Mr Derek Stubbs – 1992 to 2000
Mr Ian Sage – Foundation Principal, 1974 to 1991

Notable alumni
Bridgette Armstrong - played for the New Zealand women's national football team, attended Long Bay College.
Andrew Papas - member of the boyband Titanium. 
Paul Wiseman - spin bowler and played international cricket for New Zealand.
Jason Hicks - footballer
Tayla Alexander - singer

Gallery

References

External links
Long Bay College website
Education Review Office (ERO) report

Educational institutions established in 1975
Secondary schools in Auckland
North Shore, New Zealand
New Zealand secondary schools of S68 plan construction
1975 establishments in New Zealand